The Tunisian passport is issued to citizens of Tunisia for international travel.

Passport types
There are three main types of passport:

1. Regular (green) passport, issued to citizens for international travel, valid for 5 years.

2. "Special" (official) passport (passeport spécial, burgundy), issued to Tunisians travelling on official business.

3. Diplomatic (navy blue) passport, issued to Tunisian diplomats and their relatives.

All Tunisian passports comply with ICAO standards. They contain 32 pages.

The first machine-readable passports were issued in 2003.

Cover design
The Tunisian passport has the following wording on its cover :

Top: "الجمهورية التونسية"
"RÉPUBLIQUE TUNISIENNE" 
"REPUBLIC OF TUNISIA"

Middle: The Coat of Arms of Tunisia

Bottom: "جواز سفر "
"PASSEPORT"
"PASSPORT"

Visa requirements

In 2022, Tunisian citizens had visa-free or visa on arrival access to 71 countries and territories, ranking the Tunisian passport 77th in terms of travel freedom according to the Henley Passport Index.

Gallery of historic images

See also
See Visa requirements for Tunisian citizens.

References

Tunisia
Government of Tunisia